Imperial is the second studio album by American rapper Denzel Curry. It was released and made available for free download and streaming on SoundCloud on March 9, 2016, then re-released later on Spotify as the deluxe version on October 14, 2016. The album features guest appearances from Rick Ross, Joey Bada$$, Twelve'len and Nell. The album was supported by the single: "Knotty Head" featuring Rick Ross.

Singles
"Knotty Head" was released as the album's lead single on February 17, 2016 on Curry's SoundCloud. The album version features a guest appearance from rapper Rick Ross, while the single release only featured Curry. The production was provided by FNZ and Ronny J.

Critical reception

Imperial received critical acclaim. Stereogum described the album as "a hazy, gurgling rap record that's clearly the work of an active mind".

Track listing 
Credits adapted from Denzel Curry's official SoundCloud account and digital booklet.

 

Notes
 signifies an additional producer.
"Sick & Tired" contains two parts, "Green Store Skit" features vocals by Vares of Twelve'Len and DJ Chief Pound
"Pure Enough" features additional vocals by Vares of Twelve'Len
"If Tomorrow's Not Here" features additional vocals by Steve Lacy

Sample credits 
"ULT" contains a sample of "Sweet Nothin's", as performed by Brenda Lee and samples of "What You Will See (Heavenly Garden)" from Tekken Tag Tournament 2 soundtrack.
"Narcotics" contains a sample of "Fuck tha Police", as performed by N.W.A, excerpts of a documentary film "The Murder of Fred Hampton", excerpts of a 1964 Malcolm X interview and excerpts of 1994 Tupac Shakur interview.
"Story: No Title" contains a sample of "Crash Goes Love (Yell Apella) by Loleatta Holloway.

References

External links
 

Denzel Curry albums
2016 albums
Albums produced by DJ Dahi
Albums produced by Steve Lacy
Albums produced by Ronny J